KLFM (92.9 FM) is a radio station broadcasting a classic hits format. Licensed to Great Falls, Montana, United States, the station serves the Great Falls area. The station is currently owned by Townsquare Media

On April 10, 2017 KLFM changed their format from classic rock to classic hits, branded as "Kool 92.9".

References

External links

LFM
Townsquare Media radio stations